Evandro Motta Marcondes Guerra (born 27 December 1981) is a Brazilian volleyball player. He is part of the Brazil men's national volleyball team and Kuwait SC.

Sporting achievements
 FIVB Club World Championship
  Betim 2016 – with Sada Cruzeiro
  Betim 2019 – with Sada Cruzeiro

 CSV South American Club Championship
  Belo Horizonte 2013 – with UPCN Vóley Club
  Montes Claros 2017 – with Sada Cruzeiro
  Montes Claros 2018 – with Sada Cruzeiro
  Belo Horizonte 2019 – with Sada Cruzeiro
  Contagem 2020 – with Sada Cruzeiro

 National championships
 2006/2007  Brazilian Cup, with Cimed Esporte Clube
 2007/2008  Brazilian Championship, with Cimed Esporte Clube
 2011/2012  Argentine Cup, with Bolívar Voley
 2012/2013  Argentine Cup, with UPCN Vóley Club
 2012/2013  Argentine Championship, with UPCN Vóley Club
 2016/2017  Brazilian SuperCup, with Sada Cruzeiro
 2016/2017  Brazilian Championship, with Sada Cruzeiro
 2017/2018  Brazilian SuperCup, with Sada Cruzeiro
 2017/2018  Brazilian Cup, with Sada Cruzeiro
 2017/2018  Brazilian Championship, with Sada Cruzeiro
 2018/2019  Brazilian Cup, with Sada Cruzeiro
 2019/2020  Brazilian Cup, with Sada Cruzeiro

Youth national team
 2001  FIVB U21 World Championship
 2007  America's Cup

Individual awards
 2015: CSV South American Championship – Best Opposite Spiker 
 2016: FIVB Club World Championship – Best Opposite Spiker 
 2019: FIVB Club World Championship – Best Opposite Spiker

External links
 Player profile at Volleybox.net

References

1981 births
Living people
Brazilian men's volleyball players
Olympic volleyball players of Brazil
Volleyball players at the 2016 Summer Olympics
Medalists at the 2016 Summer Olympics
Olympic gold medalists for Brazil
Brazilian expatriates in Japan
Expatriate volleyball players in Japan
Olympic medalists in volleyball
Brazilian expatriate sportspeople in Greece
Expatriate volleyball players in Greece
Brazilian expatriate sportspeople in Italy
Expatriate volleyball players in Italy
Brazilian expatriate sportspeople in Argentina
Expatriate volleyball players in Argentina
Brazilian expatriate sportspeople in Japan
Opposite hitters